Rich Cunningham is an American politician and was a Republican member of the Utah House of Representatives representing District 50 from January 1, 2013 to January 1, 2017.

Early life and education
Cunningham attended the University of Utah, the Indiana University of Pennsylvania, and USU-College of Eastern Utah. He currently works as a financial services investment adviser and lives in South Jordan, Utah.

Political career
2014 Cunningham defeated Louis Welch in the 2014 Republican convention and then defeated Democratic nominee Gabriel Morazan with 8,554 votes (77.6%) at the November 4, 2014 general election.

2012 Challenging District 50 incumbent Republican Representative Merlynn Newbold, Cunningham was selected by the Republican convention and won the November 6, 2012 general election with 13,508 votes (77.2%) against Democratic nominee Billie Larson.

During the 2016 legislative session, Cunningham served on the Executive Offices and Criminal Justice Appropriations Subcommittee, the House Retirement and Independent Entities Committee, the House Revenue and Taxation Committee as well as the House Transportation Committee.

2016 sponsored legislation

Representative Cunningham did not floor sponsor any bills in 2016.

References

External links
Official page at the Utah State Legislature
Campaign site
Rich Cunningham at Ballotpedia
Rich Cunningham at the National Institute on Money in State Politics

Place of birth missing (living people)
Year of birth missing (living people)
Living people
Indiana University of Pennsylvania alumni
Republican Party members of the Utah House of Representatives
People from South Jordan, Utah
University of Utah alumni
21st-century American politicians